A ship burial or boat grave is a burial in which a ship or boat is used either as the tomb for the dead and the grave goods, or as a part of the grave goods itself. If the ship is very small, it is called a boat grave. This style of burial was practiced by various seafaring cultures in Asia and Europe. Notable ship burial practices include those by the  Germanic peoples, particularly by Viking Age Norsemen, as well as the pre-colonial ship burials described in the Boxer Codex (c. 15th century) in the Philippines.

Asia-Pacific

East Asia

China 
The extinct Bo people of China's Sichuan and Yunnan provinces are known for their hanging coffins.

The ancestors of the Bo people were instrumental in helping the Western Zhou overthrow the ruling Yin at the end of the Shang dynasty. Apart from this, the Bo people differed from other ethnic minorities in China through their burial traditions. Instead of the more common burial on the ground, the coffins of the Bo people were found hanging on cliffs. These coffins were also boat-shaped. Grave goods found in the coffins included blue and white porcelain bowls dated back from the Ming dynasty, iron knife, another smaller knife and two iron spear points. The Bo people were massacred by the Imperial Army in the later years of the Ming dynasty, and those who survived changed their names in order to escape oppression. Scenes of the typical daily life of the Bo people can also be seen through the cliff and wall paintings they have left behind.

In the area of Sichuan several boat-shaped coffins have been found and dated to the Eastern Zhou Period (770–255 BC). The tombs also contains a big amount of ritual objects.

Japan 
A boat-shaped coffin was found in Japan during the construction of the Kita Ward of Nagoya. This coffin was found to be older than any other previously found in Japan. Another boat-shaped coffin was found in the tomb of the Ohoburo Minami Kofun-gun in Northern Kyoto, dated to the latter half of the Yayoi Period (4 BC–4 AD).  The tomb contained grave goods including a cobalt blue glass bangle, an iron bangle, and several iron swords. Boat-shaped coffins called haniwa were more common during the Kofun period, and these coffins were seen in paintings along with the representation of the sun, moon, and the stars. This suggests the ritual symbols associated with boats even in Japan.

Southeast Asia

Philippines 

There are numerous burial sites in the Philippines that include boat burials and boat-shaped burials. In fact, present-day coffins in the Philippines still resemble canoes made from hollowed out logs. There are two famous sites of burials, the jar burials in Batanes and in Catanauan. The burial markers in Batanes are shaped like a boat, with the bow and stern appearing prominently. The markers were made from stone, and were made to appear like the outline of the traditional boat tataya. Inspection of the Chuhangin and Nakamaya sites in Batanes reveals that the markers were oriented in a Northwest-Southeast direction. Principal site investigators also discovered that the bow of the markers pointed towards the sea. But apparently, when the storms cease to pound on the islands of Batanes, the bow of the boats align with the appearance of the band of the Milky Way Galaxy. This further increases the possibility that the burials were made to align with the cosmos in belief that the boats will carry the dead to the heavens and the stars.

Some 1500 kilometers from Batanes, the Tuhian beach in Catanauan, Quezon lies another boat-shaped burial site. The boats in Catanauan are also oriented in a Northwest-Southeast direction, with the bow pointing towards the sea. The only difference is that the markers in Batanes were made from andesite and limestone, while those present in Catanauan were made from coral slabs. Also, while the markers in Batanes contained a single burial, the Catanauan markers were multiple burials.

The alignment of both of these burial sites served as evidence that people from both sites believed in the idea of the afterlife. Also, the boats were thought as a vessel for "sailing" to the heavens and the stars. This belief is a widespread idea all around the world, as we know from different burial sites all throughout Europe, the Americas and Asia.

Another burial site in Bohol was observed by the Spanish during the 16th century One account of the burial states:

"In some places, they kill slaves and bury them with their masters in order to serve them in the afterlife, this practice is carried out to the extent that many load a ship with more than sixty slaves, fill it up with food and drink, place the dead on board, and the entire vessel including live slaves buried in the earth."

Perhaps the most famous boat-shaped burial found in the Philippines is the Manunggul Jar. The jars were excavated from a Neolithic burial site in Manunggul cave of Tabon Caves at Lipuun Point at Palawan. The jars were found to be from 890–710 BC. The main feature of the Manunggul jar is the two human figures seated on a boat at the top handle of its cover. The figures represent the journey of the soul to the afterlife, with another figure serving as his oarsman.

The burial jar with a cover featuring a ship-of-the-dead […] is perhaps unrivaled in Southeast Asia; the work of an artist and master potter. This vessel provides a clear example of a cultural link between the archaeological past and the ethnographic present. The boatman […] is steering rather than paddling the "ship". The mast of the boat was not recovered. Both figures appear to be wearing bands tied over the crowns of their heads and under their jaws; a pattern still found in burial practices among the indigenous peoples in the Southern Philippines. The manner in which the hands of the front figure are folded across the chest is also a widespread practice in the islands when arranging the corpse.

The carved prow and the eye motif of the spirit boat is still found on the traditional watercraft of the Sulu Archipelago, Borneo, and Malaysia. Similarities in the execution of the ears, eyes, nose, and mouth of the figures may be seen today in the wood carving of Taiwan, the Philippines, and elsewhere in Southeast Asia.

Vietnam 

The Dong Son culture in Vietnam is known by archaeologists due to a great concentration of boat-shaped coffins. 171 boat-shaped coffins were recovered from 44 sites in Vietnam, and most of these were found from Dong Son sites. Some of these burials included carefully arranged grave goods inside the coffin along with the corpse of the dead. Also, the coffins were found strategically close to water, either rivers or small streams of sea.

Europe
A unique eyewitness account of a 10th-century ship burial among the Volga Vikings is given by Arab traveller Ibn Fadlan.

Northern Europe

Scandinavia
 Ladby – from Kerteminde on the island of Funen, Denmark
 Gokstad – from Kongshaugen, Vestfold, Norway
 Oseberg – from Oseberg farm near Tønsberg in Vestfold, Norway
 Tune – from  Haugen farm on Rolvsøy in Tune, Østfold, Norway
 Gjellestad – from the farm of the same name in Halden municipality, Norway; excavations ongoing as of June 2020.

British Isles

 Snape – Anglo-Saxon burial from Snape Common in Suffolk
 Sutton Hoo  – Anglo-Saxon burial site near Woodbridge, Suffolk
 Balladoole and Knock y Doonee – Viking burials in the Isle of Man
 Port an Eilean Mhòir – The only Viking ship burial yet discovered in mainland Britain, the mound was found in 2006 and excavated in 2011. 
 The Scar boat burial – a Viking burial found on Sanday, one of the Orkney Islands.

Baltic countries
 Salme ships – from the island of Saaremaa, Estonia

Eastern Europe

  – on an island on the Volkhov River near Veliky Novgorod, Russia
 Sarskoye Gorodishche – from a medieval fortified settlement in Yaroslavl Oblast, Russia
 Timerevo – from site near the village of Bolshoe Timeryovo, Yaroslavl, Russia
 Black Grave – from the largest burial mound in Chernihiv, Ukraine

Western Europe 

 Solleveld – south of The Hague. Late sixth century. The only boat grave in The Netherlands, former Frisia
 Fallward – north of Bremerhaven, Germany. Fifth century
 Groix, an island in the south of Brittany, France. Tenth century

See also

 Ímar Ua Donnubáin, legendary Irish navigator of partial Norse descent
 Stone ship
 Tombs of boat-shaped coffins
 Chariot burial (Iron Age tradition)
 Solar barge (Bronze Age tradition)
 Khufu ship  (Ancient Egypt)

References

 
Anglo-Saxon burial practices
Asian culture
Death in Asia